Bob Bryan and Mike Bryan were the defending champions, but lost to Ričardas Berankis and Teymuraz Gabashvili in the quarterfinals.
Berankis and Gabashvili went on to win the title, defeating Treat Huey and Scott Lipsky in the final, 6–4, 6–4.

Seeds

Draw

Draw

References
Main draw

Doubles